William Arthur Jeffries (11 March 1921 – 1981) was an English professional footballer who played in the Football League for Mansfield Town.

References

1921 births
1981 deaths
English footballers
Association football inside forwards
English Football League players
Mansfield Town F.C. players
Hull City A.F.C. players
Colchester United F.C. players